This is a list of mayors who have served the city of Montgomery, Alabama, United States.

See also
 Timeline of Montgomery, Alabama

References

External links
WorldStatesmen.org list of Montgomery mayors

 
Montgomery, Alabama
History of Montgomery, Alabama